Proctotrupidae is a family of wasps in the superfamily Proctotrupoidea of the order Hymenoptera. There are about 400 species in more than 30 genera in Proctotrupidae, found throughout most of the world.

Proctotrupidae are small parasitoid wasps, using beetle larvae and fungus gnats as hosts. They typically have a body length of 5 to 8 mm, but species may range from 3 to 15 mm.

Genera

 Acanthoserphus
 Afroserphus
 Apoglypha
 Austrocodrus
 Austroserphus
 Brachyserphus
 Carinaserphus
 Codrus
 Cryptoserphus
 Disogmus
 Exallonyx
 Fustiserphus
 Glyptoserphus
 Hormoserphus
 Maaserphus
 Mischoserphus
 Nothoserphus
 Oxyserphus
 Paracodrus
 Parthenocodrus
 Phaenoserphus
 Phaneroserphus
 Phoxoserphus
 Proctotrupes
 Pschornia
 Serphonostus
 Sminthoserphus
 Trachyserphus
 Tretoserphus
 †Dintonia
 †Gurvanotrupes
 †Pallenites
 †Peverella
 †Protoprocto

References

Proctotrupoidea
Apocrita families
Taxa named by Pierre André Latreille